Robert Vere Buxton  (29 April 1883 – 1 October 1953), known as Robin Buxton, was an English cricketer, soldier and banker. 

Buxton was born in Belgravia, London, a son of Francis Buxton, Liberal  Member of Parliament, barrister and banker. He was educated at Eton and Trinity College, Oxford. 

He was a first-class cricketer. He was in the Eton XI of 1902, scoring 3 and 74 against Harrow. At Oxford he played in the University Match with Cambridge, scored 33 and 28, and received his Blue in 1906. In 1906 and 1907, he played a few times for Middlesex. 

Buxton served in the Sudan Civil Service, 1907–11. He then joined Martins Bank, becoming a director in 1913. 

In November 1911, Buxton was commissioned in the West Kent (Queen's Own) Yeomanry in the Territorial Force. During the First World War, he served as a captain in the West Kent Yeomanry before he was seconded to the Imperial Camel Corps in 1916. Serving in the Middle East, he became a colleague of T. E. Lawrence. In 1918, a long-distance raid to sever the Hejaz railway, was launched. On 24 July, Nos. 5 and 7 Companies of the Imperial Camel Corps Brigade commanded by Major Buxton, marched from the Suez Canal to arrive at Aqaba on 30 July. On 8 August 1918, the Imperial Camel Corps, supported by the Royal Air Force, seized the well-defended Hejaz railway station at Mudawwara. They captured a large number of Ottoman prisoners and two guns and destroyed the water towers, but suffered 17 casualties in the operation. Buxton's two companies of Imperial Camel Corps continued on towards Amman, where they hoped to destroy the main bridge.

He was awarded the DSO in 1919: He was also awarded the 3rd class of the Order of the Nile of Egypt and made an officer of the Order of the Crown of Italy. He was promoted to lieutenant colonel in October 1919. 

After the war, Buxton returned to Martins Bank and his association with T. E. Lawrence continued as his banker and effectively the financier of the Subscribers' Edition of Seven Pillars of Wisdom. He was drawn by William Roberts for Seven Pillars of Wisdom. Buxton was invited to revise chapters of the book. From 1945, he was deputy chairman of Martins Bank and chairman of its London board. 

He married Irene Marguerite Pix, widow of Sir Richard Levinge, 10th baronet, in 1916. He had no issue. He died in Itchen Abbas, Hampshire.

References

Falls, Cyril (1930) Official History of the Great War Based on Official Documents by Direction of the Historical Section of the Committee of Imperial Defence; Military Operations Egypt & Palestine from June 1917 to the End of the War Vol. 2. London: H. M. Stationary
Murphy, David (2008) The Arab Revolt 1916–18 Lawrence sets Arabia Ablaze. Osprey: London. .

1883 births
1953 deaths
English cricketers
Middlesex cricketers
Oxford University cricketers
People educated at Eton College
Military personnel from London
Alumni of Trinity College, Oxford
British colonial governors and administrators in Africa
Queen's Own West Kent Yeomanry officers
Companions of the Distinguished Service Order
T. E. Lawrence
People from Belgravia
Recipients of Italian civil awards and decorations
Marylebone Cricket Club cricketers
Hertfordshire cricketers
British Army personnel of World War I